Carnew Emmets GAA is a Gaelic Athletic Association club located in Carnew, County Wicklow, Ireland. The club fields teams in both Gaelic football and hurling.

Honours

 Wicklow Senior Hurling Championship (19): 1965, 1967, 1968, 1969, 1973, 1974, 1976, 1978, 1979, 1980, 1981, 1984, 1989, 1991, 2000, 2002, 2004, 2006, 2009
 Wicklow Senior Football Championship (4): 1916, 1927, 1945, 1973

External links
Carnew Emmets GAA site

Gaelic games clubs in County Wicklow
Hurling clubs in County Wicklow
Gaelic football clubs in County Wicklow